Amreli Airport is an airstrip located in Amreli, India.

References

Airports in Gujarat
Amreli district
Airports with year of establishment missing